Keamari District (is an administrative district of Karachi Division in Sindh, Pakistan.

History 
Keamari District was created after splitting Karachi West District in 2020.

Demographics
At the time of the 2017 census, Keamari district had a population of 1,829,837, of which 974,232 were males and 855,383 females. The rural population was 121,954 (6.66%) and urban 1,707,883 (93.34%). The literacy rate is 62.54%: 68.08% for males and 56.10% for females.

The majority religion is Islam, with 98.08% of the population. Christianity is practiced by 1.36% and Hinduism by 0.52% of the population.

At the time of the 2017 census, 33.57% of the population spoke Pashto, 14.80% Urdu, 12.98% Punjabi, 10.63% Sindhi, 9.08% Hindko, 7.25% Balochi, 3.82% Saraiki as their first language.

Administration 
Keamari district is divided into four subdivisions: Keamari (also called Harbour), Baldia, Mauripur and SITE.

Following is the list of four administrative towns of Keamari District.

 Keamari Town
 Baldia Town
 Site Town
 Karachi Fish Harbour

Kemari Town 

 Kemari Town

Eight U.C.

Baldia Town 

 Baldia Town

Eight U.C.

Site Town 

 Site Town

Nine U.C.

Karachi Fish Harbour 

 Karachi Fish Harbour

See also 

 Keamari Town
 Keamari (locality)
Keamari Sub-Division

References

Districts of Sindh

Districts of Karachi